Center City Mall is a shopping mall in Downtown Paterson, New Jersey. Built at a cost of over $100 million, the  space opened in 2008 in the heart of the city's central business district. It is located with the city's urban enterprise zone, which permits merchants to charge half of the state's general sales tax rate (from 6.625% to 3.3125%).

Among shops are  Marshalls, Modells, Skechers, The Children's Place, AT&T, PSEG, TD Bank, PriceRite and other shops and restaurants. It includes the eight-screen cinema, the Fabian 8, on the upper level. Hamilton and Ward is a restaurant located with the mall

The mall has struggled to retain tenants within the city with a population with limited buying power.

Various proposals have been put forth to expand the mall including a roof-top sports arena and underground parking using state credits. The redevelopers of the mall have also proposed a hotel.

References 

Buildings and structures in Paterson, New Jersey
Shopping malls in New Jersey
Tourist attractions in Passaic County, New Jersey
Shopping malls in the New York metropolitan area
Shopping malls established in 2008
2008 establishments in New Jersey